The 2003–04 season are the Esteghlal Football Club's 3rd season in the Iran Pro League, and their 10th consecutive season in the top division of Iranian football. They are also competing in the Hazfi Cup and 59th year in existence as a football club.

Club

Kit 

|
|
|}

Coaching staff

Other information

Player
As of 1 September 2013. Esteghlal F.C. Iran Pro League Squad 2003–04

Competitions

Overview

Iran Pro League

Standings

Results summary

Results by round

Matches

Hazfi Cup

Round of 32

Round of 16

Quarter-final

Semi-final

Final

Friendlies

During season

See also
 2003–04 Iran Pro League
 2003–04 Hazfi Cup

References

External links
 Iran Premier League Statistics
 RSSSF

2003-04
Iranian football clubs 2003–04 season